The Bishops' Council of the Russian Orthodox Church is a local Council, which involves only the bishops, is a formal gathering or council of bishops together with other clerical and lay delegates representing the church to deal with matters of faith, morality, rite, and canonical and cultural life. The supreme body of the hierarchical control of the Russian Orthodox Church, as well as the highest authority in the management of the Ukrainian Orthodox Church (Moscow Patriarchate).

Functions
The modern term appeared in the "Regulations of the Russian Orthodox Church", adopted by the Local Council in 1945. During the course of the "Regulations" going only once: July 18, 1961, and even then without prior notice  to make anticanonical amendments to the "Regulations", the conclusions of the members of the clergy church community. As the Council of Bishops was finalized in the Charter, adopted by the 1988 meeting of the Local Council on 8 June 1988.
According to the Russian Orthodox Church charter adopted in 2000 the Council of Bishops: 
"The Council of Bishops is the supreme authority of the hierarchical control of the Russian Orthodox Church and a member of the diocesan bishops, as well as suffragan bishops, the heads of the Synodal institutions and Spiritual Academy or having the canonical jurisdiction over its subordinate parishes. Other vicar bishops may participate in meetings of the Council of Bishops, without the right to vote."

"The Council of Bishops meets the Patriarch of Moscow and All the Rus' (Locum Tenens) and the Holy Synod of the Russian Orthodox Church at least once every four years and in anticipation of the Local Council, and in exceptional cases provided for, in particular, paragraph 20 of section V of this Constitution"

History
In contrast to the Local Council of the Russian Orthodox Church, the Council of Bishops convened regularly since 1990, when the Patriarch of Moscow and All Russia, was elected Metropolitan of Leningrad Alexis (Ridiger)

Past meetings
13–16 August 2000 
3–8 October 2004 
24–29 June 2008 
25–26 January 2009 (before the Local Council of 2009, which elected Patriarch Kirill-I)
2–4 February 2011
2–5 February 2013 –  Patriarch Kirill suggests that he is ready to dramatically expand missionary work inside Russia and that the church will first seek to proselytize to peoples of the Far North.

References

Governing assemblies of religious organizations
Russian Orthodox Church

ru:Архиерейский собор